Luis Miguel Fernández Toledo (born 2 October 1959), known as Luis Fernandez, is a French football manager and former player who played as a defensive midfielder.

Fernandez spent most of his playing career for Paris Saint-Germain. He earned 60 international caps and scored 6 goals for the France national team between 1982 and 1992, and was part of their teams that won UEFA Euro 1984 and came third at the 1986 FIFA World Cup.

Fernandez managed PSG in two spells, winning several domestic and European honours. He also managed Cannes and Reims in France, and Athletic Bilbao, Espanyol and Real Betis in La Liga.

Playing career

Club career
Fernandez was born in Tarifa, Spain, and moved to France with his parents at age nine. He began playing football at the AS Minguettes and became a naturalized French citizen in 1981. He signed his first professional contract at age 19 with Paris Saint-Germain.

After the elimination from the 1986 FIFA World Cup, and just after he had won the Division 1 championship with PSG, Fernandez made the decision to join Jean-Luc Lagardère's team Racing Club de Paris. However, in spite of a team that was strong on paper, the club and Fernandez did not succeed, and he left Racing after three seasons.

From Racing, Fernandez joined Cannes in 1989, a more modest club. At club level, Cannes was relegated to Ligue 2 at the end of the 1991–92 season, but Fernandez decided to remain with the club and end his career when his contract expired. A few weeks, however, Cannes named Fernandez its manager, and so he finished the season as player-manager, leading Cannes back to Division 1 at the end of the season. He then retired from playing professionally to become a full-time manager.

International career

Fernandez quickly established himself as an expert in winning the ball, but also capable of precise passing, and at the end of 1982, he was called up for the France national team and debuted against the Netherlands on 10 November 1982. At age 23, Fernandez was immediately an important part of the team that only months earlier had been semi-finalists of the 1982 FIFA World Cup. He formed the national midfield with such French national greats as Jean Tigana in the central midfield, and the offensive players Alain Giresse and Michel Platini, a midfield that became known as the "magic square". With the national team, Fernandez won UEFA Euro 1984 at home in France, and reached the semi-final of the 1986 World Cup in Mexico.

Fernandez was still a part of the French national team in spite of a declining physique. Not a starting player under new national team manager Michel Platini, Fernandez would play the role of a late joker, with the job to clinch a result at the end of the match. Fernandez took part in Euro 1992, where France were eliminated in the group stage, and Fernandez decided to end his international career.

Managerial career

Cannes
After Cannes' promotion to Division 1, Fernandez continued his work at the club and led it to UEFA Cup qualification. He was named Manager of the Year at the end of the 1993–94 season, on grounds of Fernandez's alluring philosophy of offensive tactics with a use of young players. The profile of Fernandez particularly interested Paris Saint-Germain. Despite winning Division 1 and having a good run in the UEFA Champions League, PSG failed to play attractive football, partly because of Portuguese manager Artur Jorge, who applied a more rigid strategic system. The board of PSG saw in Fernandez the ideal manager to reform the image of the club.

Paris Saint-Germain
In the 1994–95 UEFA Champions League, Fernandez's PSG reached the semi-finals by eliminating an FC Barcelona side led by Johan Cruyff. In the same year, his team also picked up the Coupe de France against RC Strasbourg and the Coupe de la Ligue against SC Bastia. Despite then losing David Ginola and George Weah, PSG won their first European honour, the 1995–96 UEFA Cup Winners' Cup against Rapid Vienna.

Athletic Bilbao
Fernandez had four seasons in charge of Athletic Bilbao in Spain's La Liga from 1996 to 2000. In 1997–98, he led the team to UEFA Champions League qualification as runners-up to Barcelona.

Return to Paris Saint-Germain
After turning down the vacant position at rivals Olympique de Marseille the previous month, Fernandez returned to PSG in December 2000, succeeding the sacked Philippe Bergeroo at the 12th-placed club. By finishing 9th, the team qualified for the 2001 UEFA Intertoto Cup, and won the final on the away goals rule against Brescia.

In March 2003, after the decline from a good start that saw PSG top in October, Fernandez announced that he would retire at the end of the season. In the game before the announcement, his club won Le Classique 3–0 at Marseille's Stade Velodrome.

Espanyol
On 4 November 2003, Fernandez was hired by Espanyol, who were situated in last place in the league table with five points from ten games, and had sacked Javier Clemente. He saved them from relegation with a 2–0 home win over Real Murcia in the final game of the season, with both goals in the last 20 minutes.

Al-Rayyan & Beitar Jerusalem
In 2005, Fernandez was briefly in charge of Al-Rayyan of the Qatar Stars League before switching to Israel's Beitar Jerusalem in November. He took the team to third place and UEFA Cup qualification in his only season.

Real Betis
Fernandez joined Real Betis midway through the 2006–07 La Liga season and Betis' centenary season. However, he was released on 10 June 2007 following a 5–0 loss at the Estadio Manuel Ruiz de Lopera to Osasuna with just one match remaining in Betis' relegation threatened season. Including Copa del Rey matches, Fernandez led Betis for 26 matches, winning 5, drawing 16 and losing 7. His tenure lasted from 27 December 2006 to 10 June 2007.

Stade de Reims
Fernandez joined Stade de Reims halfway through the 2008–09 season. Reims were playing in Ligue 2, the second tier of French football, but Fernandez was unable to avoid relegation. He was replaced in June 2009 by Marc Collat.

Israel
On 21 March 2010, Fernandez was appointed manager of the Israel national team on an 18-month contract effective 1 May. He vowed to only have Israelis on his coaching team. The following February, he was suspended for an outstanding debt to Al-Rayyan. In December 2011, his contract was allowed to expire after failure to qualify for UEFA Euro 2012, and Eli Guttman succeeded him.

Guinea
On 29 April 2015, Fernandez signed a 20-month contract with the Guinea national team, with the option of an extension. He left by mutual consent on 24 May 2016, due to disputes within the Guinean Football Federation.

Honours

Player
Paris Saint-Germain
 French Division 1: 1985–86
 Coupe de France: 1981–82, 1982–83

France
 UEFA European Championship: 1984
 Artemio Franchi Cup: 1985

Individual
 French Player of the Year: 1985
 Étoile d'Or: 1986

Manager
Paris Saint-Germain
 Coupe de France: 1994–95
 Coupe de la Ligue: 1994–95
 Trophée des Champions: 1995
 UEFA Cup Winners' Cup: 1995–96
 UEFA Intertoto Cup: 2001

References

External links

1959 births
Living people
People from Campo de Gibraltar
Sportspeople from the Province of Cádiz
French footballers
France international footballers
Spanish football managers
Spanish footballers
Spanish emigrants to France
French people of Spanish descent
Association football midfielders
Paris Saint-Germain F.C. players
Racing Club de France Football players
AS Cannes players
Ligue 1 players
Ligue 2 players
UEFA Euro 1984 players
1986 FIFA World Cup players
UEFA Euro 1992 players
UEFA European Championship-winning players
AS Cannes managers
Paris Saint-Germain F.C. managers
Athletic Bilbao managers
RCD Espanyol managers
Al-Rayyan SC managers
Beitar Jerusalem F.C. managers
Real Betis managers
Stade de Reims managers
Israel national football team managers
Guinea national football team managers
La Liga managers
Ligue 1 managers
Ligue 2 managers
Qatar Stars League managers
French expatriate football managers
Spanish expatriate football managers
Expatriate football managers in Israel
Expatriate football managers in Qatar
Expatriate football managers in Guinea